"Matrimonial Causes Act" is a stock short title used for legislation in the United Kingdom relating to marriage law.

List
 The Matrimonial Causes Act 1857
 The Matrimonial Causes Act 1858
 The Matrimonial Causes Act 1859
 The Matrimonial Causes Act 1860
 extended by the Perpetuation of Matrimonial Causes Act, 1860 Act 1862
 The Matrimonial Causes Act 1864
 The Matrimonial Causes Act 1866
 The Matrimonial Causes and Marriage Law (Ireland) Amendment Act 1870
 The Matrimonial Causes and Marriage Law (Ireland) Amendment Act 1871
 The Matrimonial Causes Act 1873
 The Matrimonial Causes Act 1878
 The Matrimonial Causes Act 1884
 The Matrimonial Causes Act 1907
 The Matrimonial Causes (Dominions Troops) Act 1919
 The Matrimonial Causes Act 1923
 The Matrimonial Causes Act 1937
 The Matrimonial Causes Act (Northern Ireland) 1939
 The Matrimonial Causes (War Marriages) Act 1944
 The Matrimonial Causes Act 1950
 The Matrimonial Causes (Property and Maintenance) Act 1958
 The Matrimonial Causes Act 1963
 The Matrimonial Causes Act 1965
 The Matrimonial Causes (Reports) Act (Northern Ireland) 1966
 The Matrimonial Causes Act 1967
 The Matrimonial Causes Act 1973

The Matrimonial Causes Acts 1857 to 1878 was the collective title of the following Acts:
The Matrimonial Causes Act 1857 (20 & 21 Vict c 85)
The Matrimonial Causes Act 1858 (21 & 22 Vict c 108)
The Matrimonial Causes Act 1859 (22 & 23 Vict c 61)
The Matrimonial Causes Act 1860 (23 & 24 Vict c 144)
The Matrimonial Causes Act 1866 (29 & 30 Vict c 32)
The Divorce Amendment Act 1868 (31 & 32 Vict c 77)
The Matrimonial Causes Act 1873 (36 & 37 Vict c 31)
The Matrimonial Causes Act 1878 (41 & 42 Vict c 19)

See also
List of short titles

References

Lists of legislation by short title
Marriage law in the United Kingdom